WRC: FIA World Rally Championship is a racing video game developed by Traveller's Tales for the PlayStation Portable. The game features content from the 2005 World Rally Championship, which was also featured on WRC: Rally Evolved.

Reception

The game received "average" reviews according to the review aggregation website Metacritic.  In Japan, where the game was ported and published by Spike on 9 March 2006, Famitsu gave it a score of all four sevens for a total of 28 out of 40.

References

External links
 

2005 video games
PlayStation Portable games
PlayStation Portable-only games
Traveller's Tales games
World Rally Championship video games
Video games developed in the United Kingdom
Video game spin-offs